"Rhythm Emotion" is the second single by J-pop duo Two-Mix, released by King Records on November 22, 1995. Composed by the duo of Shiina Nagano and Minami Takayama, the song was used as the second opening theme of the anime series Mobile Suit Gundam Wing.

The single peaked at No. 8 on Oricon's weekly singles chart, becoming the duo's first top-10 single. It sold over 353,000 copies and was certified Gold by the RIAJ.

Track listing
All lyrics are written by Shiina Nagano. All music is composed by Minami Takayama. All music is arranged by Two-Mix.

Chart position

Certification

Other versions 
Remixes of the song were released on the albums Two-(Re)Mix, BPM 150 Max, and BPM "Dance Unlimited". The duo recorded an orchestral mix with Les Solistes de Versailles on the 1998 self-cover album Baroque Best. An English-language version was recorded on the 2000 self-cover album BPM Cube.

Cover versions 
 Move covered the song on their 2011 cover album anim.o.v.e. 03.
 Yui Sakakibara covered the song on her 2015 cover album Love × Cover Songs 2.
 Nagi Yanagi covered the song on the 2022 various artists album Two-Mix Tribute Album "Crysta-Rhythm".

References

External links 
 
 

1995 singles
1995 songs
Two-Mix songs
Gundam songs
Mobile Suit Gundam Wing
Japanese-language songs
King Records (Japan) singles
Songs written by Minami Takayama